The Tairua River is located on the Coromandel Peninsula in the North Island of New Zealand.

The small Shoe Island lies directly opposite the river's mouth,  into the Pacific.

Thames-Coromandel District
Rivers of Waikato
Rivers of New Zealand

Fishing 
The Tairua River is a clean and clear freshwater river that flows into the east coast of the Coromandel Peninsular at Tairua Harbour. The river is equipped with a large rock bed and has beautiful scenery for all fishermen.  There are several big fish to be caught from the Tairua, but rainbow trout is the most popular.  Most fisherman will access the river from the middle that is easily accessed.  For more exclusive fishing fishermen may access the river from the north or south but must be accessed by foot.

Lures and River Rules 
In mid summer cicada patterns are most used for flies.  Green beetles’ pattern is more used around November time frame.  All wet flies are accepted at the river.  Spinners may be used only with a small blade tail.  The red and gold spinner patterns are the most common used colors. When fishing the Tairua River you may only bag up to 5 fish a day.  Out of those fish they must be 30 cm or larger.

Citations 
“Tairua River.” Nzfishing.com, nzfishing.com/auckland-waikato/where-to-fish/tairua-river/. Accessed 18 Oct. 2021.